Abdallah Saleh Ali Al Ajmi (2 August 1978 – 23 March 2008) was a Kuwaiti citizen, who was held in extrajudicial detention in the United States Guantanamo Bay detainment camps, in Cuba. His Guantanamo Internment Serial Number was 220. Joint Task Force Guantanamo counter-terrorism analysts reports indicated that he was born on 2 August 1978, in Almadi, Kuwait.

On 2 September 2003, attorneys Thomas Wilner, Neil H. Koslowe, Kristine A. Huskey, and Heather Lamberg Kafele filed a Petition for writ of Certiorari on behalf of Al Ajmi and eleven other Guantanamo detainees.<ref
name=WritCertiorariThomasWilner20030902>Petition for writ of Certiorari, Findlaw, 2 September 2003</ref>

In March or April 2008, Al Ajmi conducted a suicide attack in Iraq.

Combatant Status Review 

A Summary of Evidence memo was prepared for his tribunal. The memo accused him of the following:

Abdullah Saleh Ali Al Ajmi v. United States of America

A writ of habeas corpus, Abdullah Saleh Ali Al Ajmi v. United States of America, was submitted on Abdullah Saleh Ali Al Ajmi's behalf.

In response, on 15 September 2004, the Department of Defense released 12 pages of unclassified documents related to his Combatant Status Review Tribunal.

Al Ajmi's "enemy combatant" status was confirmed by Tribunal panel 2 on 2 August 2004 — making his own of the first cases to be confirmed.

Detainee election form

Al Ajmi's Personal Representative's Detainee election form stated that they met for twenty minutes, and recorded in its notes section:

Earned mention in the "No-hearing hearings" study
According to the study entitled, No-hearing hearings, Al Ajmi was the first captive to have his Tribunal convened. His Tribunal was convened on 2 August 2004.
The study notes:

Administrative Review Board 

Detainees whose Combatant Status Review Tribunal labeled them "enemy combatants" were scheduled for annual Administrative Review Board hearings.  These hearings were designed to assess the threat a detainee might pose if released or transferred, and whether there were other factors that warranted his continued detention.

Summary of Evidence memo
A Summary of Evidence memo was prepared for 
Abdallah Salih Ali Al Ajmi's
Administrative Review Board, 
on 4 February 2005.
The memo listed eleven "primary factors favor[ing] continued detention".

The following primary factors favor continued detention

The following primary factors favor release or transfer

Transcript
Al Ajmi's Board hearing convened on 4 February 2005. In the Spring of 2006, in response to a court order from Jed Rakoff the Department of Defense published a twenty-five page summarized transcript from his Administrative Review Board hearing.

Board recommendations

In early September 2007, the Department of Defense released two heavily redacted memos, from his Board, to Gordon R. England, the Designated Civilian Official. The Board's recommendation was unanimous. The Board's recommendation was redacted. England authorized his transfer on 20 May 2005.

Repatriation and acquittal
Al Ajmi was repatriated to Kuwait and taken into Kuwaiti custody on 3 November 2005. Al Ajmi was freed, on bail, while he awaited trial. The five men trial began in March 2006, and were acquitted on 22 July 2006. The Washington Post reported that the two main charges were that the detainees had helped fund Al Wafa, an Afghan charity with ties to al-Qaeda, and that they had fought alongside the Taliban. Further, the prosecution argued that the detainees actions had endangered Kuwait's political standing and its relations with friendly nations.

The detainees' defense had argued that testimony secured in Guantanamo could not be used in Kuwaiti courts, because the detainees and interrogators had not signed them. Furthermore, they had argued that the allegations the USA had directed at them were not violations of Kuwaiti law.

In an October 2011 article about the torture of other former captives from Kuwait, CNN'''s Jenifer Fenton reported that people who knew him "described him as unstable when he returned from Guantanamo."Suicide bombing after release

On 1 May 2008, Al Ajmi's cousin told Al Arabiya television that Al Ajmi had carried out a suicide bombing in Mosul, Iraq. On 2 May 2008, The International Herald Tribune reported that the three most recent suicide bombings in Mosul occurred on 26 April 2008, and killed seven people.  According to the report,  Al Ajmi's cousin said that Al Ajmi had disappeared "two weeks ago". However, a 2009 The Washington Post article reported that Al Ajmi killed himself in a suicide bombing on 23 March 2008, which killed 13 Iraqi policemen. A CNN'' report from October 2011 said the attack "...left six people dead, including two police officers.".

Defense Intelligence Agency claims he "returned to terrorism"
The Defense Intelligence Agency asserted Abdallah Salih al-Ajmi had "returned to terrorism".

The DIA reported:

See also
Adel Zamel Abdul-Mohsen
Saad Madhi al-Azmi

References

External links
 Identification of ex-Guantánamo suicide bomber unleashes Pentagon propaganda Andy Worthington

1978 births
2008 deaths
Kuwaiti extrajudicial prisoners of the United States
Guantanamo detainees known to have been released
Suicide bombers
Al-Qaeda bombers
Islamist suicide bombers